i Aquarii can refer to several different astronomical objects:

 i1 Aquarii (106 Aquarii), B-type main-sequence star
 i2 Aquarii (107 Aquarii), double star
 i3 Aquarii (108 Aquarii), α2 Canum Venaticorum variable star

Aquarii, i
i Aquarii